Zig and Zag is an animated sitcom series, commissioned by CBBC and RTÉ and featuring the extraterrestrial puppets Zig and Zag from the planet Zog. It aired on CBBC and RTÉjr. Both Zig and Zag are voiced by the characters' original voice actors, creators and writers, Ciaran Morrison and Mick O'Hara.

Plot
Alien brothers Zig and Zag crash land in humdrum suburbia and set up home. On their fun filled adventures they 'make the most' of what Planet Earth has to offer.

Cast
Ciaran Morrison as Zig (Zigmund Ambrose Zogly) a beige extraterrestrial. He is the brother of Zag.
Mick O'Hara as Zag (Zagnatius Hillary Zogly) a purple extraterrestrial. He is the brother of Zig.
Debra Stephenson as Nellie.
Tara Flynn as Abs.
Paul Tylak as Pek
Inel Tomlinson as Agent A. Gent
Allen Doyle as Mrs. Eyebrows.
Sam McGovern as Agent Honey
Lisa Garvey as Mrs. Jones

The above actors also act as an ensemble cast providing all additional voices for recurring or one-off characters that feature in each episode.

Characters

Main

Zig: A carefree alien with a heart of gold and a brain with the shape and processing power of a banana. He's not the brightest spark in the solar system, but he's endlessly enthusiastic, curious and ready for whatever adventures come his way.
Zag: A classic older brother type; over confident, thinks he smarter than he really is and acts older than his age. Zag is always immaculately groomed with purple fur with green spots and in terms of fashion is always ‘on trend’. He also processes ‘super’ manners, employed when getting around influential adults or stubborn neighbours. In the episode "DI Why?", it is revealed that Zag's middle name is Hilary.
Nellie: A fun pre-teen who helps her Dad out in the local mini-mart. Nellie is opinionated and quick to pick apart Zig and Zag's Semi-thought-out plans, she usually redirects them on to the right path, even if unintentionally. She thinks Zig is cute and loves to play up to him with faux flirting to get a reaction but it always goes completely over his own head. She is an offhand with Zag as she doesn't like his affectations. More often than not Nellie becomes a valuable ally when things get really out of hand for Zig and Zag! She's probably the Z brothers' best friend on Earth.

Recurring
Mrs. Eyebrows: Zig and Zag's enigmatic next door neighbour, an elderly woman who has an imaginary cat called Mr. President.
Mr. Jones: Mr. Jones is a nervous, always running late type. His favourite thing of all is his ‘quiet time’, but that is more often than not ruined as Zig and Zag always run to him for any and every bit of ‘how things work on Earth’ advice. And despite his protestations, Mr. Jones has become their unwitting mentor.
 Mrs. Jones: Mrs. Jones is the opposite of her husband; larger than life, enthusiastic and is always striving to be the perfect neighbour! She often lands on Zig and Zag's doorstep with some freshly baked beetroot macaroons, so they ain’t complaining!
 Brie and Stilton: are the Jones’ strange staring children. They never utter a word, all you ever hear them doing is breathing loudly through their noses.
 Nellie's Dad: We never see Nellie's Dad's face. He is always stacking shelves up a ladder. He is always sent tumbling when Zig takes an item from the bottom of a recently stacked pile of goods, this is followed by Zag announcing over the shop's Tannoy ‘Clean up on aisle three!’!
The Secret Agents: The two Agents work for P.A.N.T.S (Prevention of Alien Network Takeover Squad) Agent A. Gent is an old school Man-in-Black, he has spent his whole career convinced that Earth is going to be invaded by aliens, but it never happened! He was just about to retire when Zig and Zag crash-landed in his neighbourhood. At last, the alien invasion he predicted is imminent! To get him out of the office and out of his hair his boss tasks Agent A. Gent and a level headed young operative Agent Honey to keep an eye on Zig and Zag... just in case.
 Abs & Pek Von Pumpiniron: The Von Pumpiniron's are an ex-tumbling act who now run the local Megagym. They live next door to Zig and Zag, are super-sporty and highly competitive. It's a mystery to Zig and Zag whether Abs is male or female. Pek doesn't speak any English, however Zig some how understands his every word.
 'The Marshmallow of Destiny: Zig has a marshmallow that he keeps in his anorak pocket. He only seeks the mallow's advice in times of extreme crisis. Zig is the only one who hears or sees the MOD imparting his wise advice.

Production
On 15 April 2015 it was announced that a new animated Zig and Zag series was in production for CBBC and RTÉ. On 16 August 2015 the theme tune was composed and recorded by Ricky Wilson and Simon Rix from the band Kaiser Chiefs. It was also announced that it would start in early 2016.

Episodes

Series 1 (2016)
The first series of twenty six episodes began broadcasting on RTÉjr on 1 March 2016 and CBBC on 25 April 2016.

Shorts (2016–17)

A series of shorts, known as Zogcasts air on CBBC.

Music
Theme Tune: The forty second theme tune entitled ‘5,4,3,2,1’ was created by Ricky Wilson and Simon Rix from British indie rock band Kaiser Chiefs who were fans of Zig and Zag from their time of The Big Breakfast.
The Zog Drop: In every episode when Zig and Zag have that eureka moment that sends them on their way to glory (or failure) they burst into a spontaneous Haka style dance created by composer for the series Jonathan Casey.

References

2016 British television series debuts
2010s British animated television series
2010s British children's television series
2010s British teen sitcoms
2016 Irish television series debuts
British children's animated comedy television series
Irish children's animated comedy television series
British flash animated television series
Irish flash animated television series
BBC children's television shows
RTÉ original programming
Animated television series about brothers
Animated television series about extraterrestrial life